The National Gambling Impact Study Commission Act of 1996 is an Act of Congress that was signed into law by President of the United States Bill Clinton.

This legislation established the National Gambling Impact Study Commission in 1997 to conduct a comprehensive legal and factual study of the social and economic impacts of gambling in the United States on: 
 Federal, State, local, and Native American tribal governments; 
 Communities and social institutions generally, including individuals, families, and businesses within such communities and institutions. 
Mandates a report to the President, the Congress, State Governors, and Native American tribal governments. Requires the Commission to contract with the Advisory Commission on Intergovernmental Relations and the United States National Research Council for assistance 
with the study. Authorizes appropriations. Specifically the commission was to look at the following:
 existing policies and practices concerning the legalization of prohibition of gambling
the relationship between gambling and crime
the nature and impact of pathological and problem gambling
the impacts of gambling on individuals, communities, and the economy, including depressed economic areas
the extent to which gambling revenue had benefited various governments and whether alternative revenue sources existed
 the effects of technology, including the Internet on gambling

The study lasted two years, and in 1999 the commission released it final report.  There was a separate section on Indian gaming provided.

Findings on Indian Gaming

The commission had many recommendations for the Indian gaming industry.  It primarily called on the United States Congress to resolve the cycle of legal issues produced by the Indian Gaming Regulatory Act.  It also recommended that "tribes, states, and local governments should continue to work together to resolve issues of mutual concern rather than relying on federal law to solve problems for them" The results of the study on Indian gaming industry are hard to determine.

Footnotes

External links
 
 
 National Gambling Impact Study Commission website
 

Acts of the 104th United States Congress
United States federal gambling legislation